Even Menachem is a moshav in northern Israel. Located in the Western Galilee, about six kilometers northwest of Ma'alot-Tarshiha, it falls under the jurisdiction of Ma'ale Yosef Regional Council.

History
The moshav was founded on 13 September 1960 by Jewish immigrants and refugees from North Africa on the land that had belonged to the  Palestinian  villages  of Iqrit, Al-Nabi Rubin, Suruh and  Tarbikha, whose inhabitants were expelled during the 1948 Arab–Israeli War.  It was named after Arthur Menachem Hantke, a prominent Zionist leader in pre-war Germany.

The moshav came under Hezbollah rocket fire several times over its history due to its proximity to the Israel-Lebanon border; most recently it was hit during Hezbollah's diversionary salvo at the opening of the 2006 Lebanon War, as well as during the later rocket and mortar attacks.

References

External links
Nimrod Getzov (2006): Even Menahem, Hadashot Arkheologiyot – Excavations and Surveys in Israel, No. 118.

Moshavim
Populated places established in 1960
Populated places in Northern District (Israel)
1960 establishments in Israel
North African-Jewish culture in Israel